The first tier of intercollegiate sports in the United States includes sports that are sanctioned by one of the collegiate sport governing bodies. The major sanctioning organization is the National Collegiate Athletic Association (NCAA). Before mid-1981, women's top-tier intercollegiate sports were solely governed by the Association for Intercollegiate Athletics for Women (AIAW). Smaller colleges are governed by the National Association of Intercollegiate Athletics (NAIA). Two-year colleges are governed by the National Junior College Athletic Association (NJCAA) in most of the country, except for the unaffiliated California Community College Athletic Association (CCCAA) and Northwest Athletic Conference (NWAC).

The second tier consists of competition between student clubs from different colleges, not organized by and therefore not formally representing the institutions or their faculties. This tier is also considered to be "intercollegiate" sports. Many of these sports have governing bodies that operate only at the collegiate level, such as the NCRHA.  Other sports are governed by their national governing body, for example, USA Ultimate. College sports originated as student activities.

Intercollegiate Team Champions of Non-NCAA and Non-AIAW Sports in the United States:
 The championships below were bestowed by the governing bodies of specific collegiate sports in years when the sport lacked official varsity status in the NCAA (which many still lack) or in the AIAW (and the DGWS that preceded it).
 Women's rugby and equestrian are currently on the NCAA list of "Emerging Sports."
 Some sports (particularly women's sports) championships that are currently sanctioned by the NCAA were previously administered by a single-sport governing body (e.g., rifle, women's ice hockey, women's water polo).
 At some colleges, some of these sports operate at a club level outside of any athletic department. On the other hand, some teams have been accorded varsity status within their schools' athletic programs. Generally, there is no strict separation during competition, but there are exceptions (e.g., Varsity Equestrian since 2006, as it seeks official NCAA status).
 This list is reserved for champions of sports in which the NCAA did not also recognize a champion in a given year. Thus, non-varsity and/or club-level champions are excluded for sports that had a contemporary NCAA champion (e.g., men's ice hockey, alpine skiing) or other collegiate varsity-level champion (e.g., IRA rowing).
 Two exceptions are (1) women's fencing (the NCAA has not offered a women-only team championship since 1989) and (2) women's bowling (the long-established US Bowling Congress championship has co-eminence).

Key to initialism

Some schools in this list are more commonly known by their initials.

Key to location

The locations of some schools in this list are not obvious from their names.

Adventure Racing

United States Adventure Racing Association
Mixed teams unless indicated otherwise.

Archery

USA Archery

US Collegiate Archery
(preceded by National Archery Association)

The inaugural U.S. intercollegiate archery championships were held in November 1967 at Arizona State University with individual competition only. The second such event was in May 1969. Team titles were not bestowed, although team scores were kept.

Outdoor Target

Junior College and 2-Year College Division (discontinued before 1985)

# News reports of USIAC results in 1983 and 1984 mention only four-year schools. In 1985, two- and four-year schools are combined in the reported USIAC standings.

Recurve and Compound Bow

† There being a lack of specific citations for this mixed team title, the result was calculated based on the raw FITA round scores. (It appears that by 1995 the competition format added bracketed elimination rounds after the initial FITA rounds to determine the men's and women's champions, but not the mixed team titles.)

‡ Based on a news account, it appears that James Madison was the only team eligible for the women's compound bow team title, a new discipline in the 1995 USIAC.
 
∗ This is believed to be the first time a tribal college team has won the top-level intercollegiate national championship event in any sport.

Bow Hunter

In 2012 the USIAC began team competition in bow hunting.

Basic Bow

3D Target

National Archery Association

Telegraphic or Mail Tournament (Women Recurve)

National Archery Association (1930 - at least 1973)

 1930 UCLA or Phoenix JC
 1931 UCLA or Phoenix JC
 1932 UCLA or Phoenix JC
 1933 Phoenix Junior College 
 1934 Phoenix Junior College 

 1935 Los Angeles Junior College 
 1936 Los Angeles Junior College 
 1937 Los Angeles Junior College 
 1938 Los Angeles Junior College 
 1939 Los Angeles City College 

 1940 Los Angeles City College 
 1941 Connecticut  
 1942 Connecticut
 19??
 1972 East Stroudsburg State, Drexel (different rounds)

Badminton

Women's championships administered by DGWS (1970-72) / AIAW (1973-82) are included for completeness.

All others administered by American Badminton Association (later named U.S. Badminton Assn., now USA Badminton).

Intercollegiate Badminton Association, a league founded in 2007, held a few competitions starting in 2008 and faded for lack of members.

Billiards
Association of College Unions International(ACUI) has conducted intercollegiate billiards tournaments since 1933. See the ACUI website for the list of men's and women's individual champions since 1937.

(1936–38 telegraphic)

Bowling
United States Bowling Congress 

2017 title won by Webber International was vacated due to use of a player who was ineligible for competition.

United States Bowling Congress 

Starting in 2004, the NCAA has sponsored a women's team championship, apart from the USBC national championships.
2020 edition was canceled due to COVID-19 pandemic.

Boxing

National Collegiate Boxing Association
Preceded by NCAA championships, 1932–1960

Men

Women

United States Intercollegiate Boxing Association

∗ Cancelled due to the COVID-19 outbreak.

Canoe/Kayak

Flatwater
USA Canoe/Kayak

Downriver
American Canoe Association 
 
† In 2007 all other competitors withdrew because of rough river conditions.

Climbing
USA Climbing

Cricket
Intercollegiate Cricket Association (1881–1924)

Twenty20
American College Cricket

Croquet

US Croquet Association

American Rules

Golf Croquet

Curling

College Curling USA

US College Curling National Championship

Prior to 2013, the championship was set up into "Experience" Divisions (Division I most experienced, Division V least experienced) with schools permitted entries in more than one division. Entry into the championship tournament was open to any team until the division bracket was full. Starting in 2013 there is a single national champion; entry is by invitation to the top sixteen schools in the country based on Merit Points earned in competition during the year. In all cases there is no gender breakdown; teams can consist of any combination of men and women players.

Cycling

Disc Golf

National Collegiate Disc Golf Union

† different names for same school

Dodgeball

National Collegiate Dodgeball Association

Equestrian

Equestrian became an NCAA Emerging Sports for Women in 2002.

Sources:

English

Intercollegiate Horse Show Association

Note: Emory & Henry College absorbed Virginia Intermont College's equestrian program when it closed at the end of the 2013–14 academic year. All championships from both colleges are credited to the program as "Intermont Equestrian at Emory & Henry College."

American National Riding Commission
The championship showcases the American Forward Riding System and the sporting horse. Judged on equitation as a three-phase competition, competitors complete a dressage sportif ride, an outdoor hunter trials course and a USEF Medal-type hunter seat equitation course. Riders ride the same horse throughout the competition, and jumps do not exceed 3 feet in height.

Note: Emory & Henry College absorbed Virginia Intermont College's equestrian program when it closed at the end of the 2013–14 academic year. All championships from both colleges are credited to the program as "Intermont Equestrian at Emory & Henry College."

Dressage

Intercollegiate Dressage Association

Note: Emory & Henry College absorbed Virginia Intermont College's equestrian program when it closed at the end of the 2013–14 academic year. All championships from both colleges are credited to the program as "Intermont Equestrian at Emory & Henry College."

Western

American Quarter Horse Association

Multidisciplinary
National Collegiate Equestrian Association

A Varsity Equestrian championship is held each year among colleges and universities competing at the varsity level. Because equestrian has two unique disciplines, through 2013 this event crowned a national champion in each of three areas: Western, Hunter Seat and Overall.

Fencing, Women-only
National Intercollegiate Women's Fencing Association (NIWFA), (IWFA 1929-63)

Team Foil

NIWFA title competition was held in addition to the AIAW championship from 1980 to 1982 and the NCAA women's championship from 1982 to 1989. Starting in 1990, the NCAA has sponsored a combined men's and women's team championship, declaring one overall combined champion. NIWFA membership in 2018 consisted of 20 schools. There were 41 schools with women's varsity programs in all divisions of the NCAA, as of 9/1/09. Most, if not all, NIWFA member schools are members of the NCAA.

* did not win NCAA women’s championship (held 1982-89)

Team Épée, Team Sabre, Combined Weapon

† Foil and Épée only

Figure Skating

US Figure Skating

Fishing

Bass Fishing (two-person team)

FLW Outdoors College Series

Bassmaster College Bass Fishing Series

Association of Collegiate Anglers, Cabela's Collegiate Bass Fishing Series

Saltwater Fishing

An intercollegiate deep-sea fishing championship was held from 1956 through 1975 off of Wedgeport, Nova Scotia. Yale University won in 1956. Beginning in 1974, Coastal Carolina University has hosted an annual intercollegiate invitational fishing tournament.

Flag Football
American Collegiate Intramural Sports and Fitness

National Intramural-Recreational Sports Association

Flowboarding
These competitions were part of the CBS Sports "Collegiate Nationals " and "Alt Games" presentations.

Flying (Aviation)

National Intercollegiate Flying Association
 Aircraft type certificated as Airplane-Single Engine Land only.
 No more than four (4) place.
 Maximum horsepower-250 bhp.
 May not be equipped with an after-market short take-off and landing modification.
 Contestants acting as pilot-in-command in flying events must possess at least a Private Pilot certificate with appropriate category and class ratings.
 Contestants who hold or have ever held an Airline Transport Pilot certificate or have accumulated more than 1500 total flight hours are not eligible to compete.
Flying events:
 Power Off Landing
 Short Field Approach and Landing
 Navigation
 Message Drop
 IFR (Instrument Flight Rules) Precision Flight
 IFR Simulated Flight
 CRM/LOFT (Crew Resource Management/Line Oriented Flight Training)

SAFECON Championship Trophy

Handball (American)

US Handball Association

From 1953 to 1980 only a men's title was awarded. Women participated in a non-scoring method in 1980. From 1981 through 1986 women contributed to a combined team championship, the only title given. In 1987 two championships — a men's and a women's — were established. In 1988, the current men-women-combined championships were established.

Hurling
National Collegiate Gaelic Athletic Association

Judo

Karate

ISKF Shotokan

National Collegiate Karate Association

† In 1999, 2000 and 2001, the kumite competition included brown belts in addition to black belts.∗ Hurricane Katrina caused cancellation.¶ 2012 results do not mention team titles for kumite.‡ Official results state that the championship title was for "Collegiate Team Kumite."

ITF Karate
Schools that follow the ITF standards typically use the Chang Hon forms.

Orienteering
US Orienteering Federation

Paintball

Beginning with the 2011 championship, the Division AA competition switched to the Race To-2 format. Division A format is X-Ball.

National Collegiate Paintball Association

Parachuting

US Parachute Association

The USPA National Collegiate Parachute Championships consist of both individual and team events. Individual events are classic accuracy, sport accuracy and freefall style. The team events are classic accuracy and formation diving (and before 2007, 2-person freefly diving). Schools other than the service academies have been competitive only in sport accuracy and freefly diving. 
In the Team Accuracy and Formation Skydiving events, multiple yearly entrants from the service academies have dominated. For example, in 2008, 6 USMA and 4 USAFA teams placed in the top 10 in team accuracy.

Pistol
National Rifle Association

Polo (Arena)

US Polo Association

Powerboating (Outboards)

Powerlifting
Earlier national collegiate powerlifting championships are known to have been held during 1969 (at Florida State) and 1976 (at Ohio University).

USA Powerlifting/American Drug Free Powerlifting Association

* In addition to the traditional equipped divisions, raw divisions were inaugurated for both men and women in 2016, with 12 women's and 14 men's teams entering the raw team competition.
 
World Association of Benchers and Deadlifters

Racquetball
US Racquetball Association
Division I and II championship competitions were separated in 2005.

Division II

Rodeo

National Intercollegiate Rodeo Association

During 1960, the NIRA split into two organizations: the American Collegiate Rodeo Association (ACRA) with 13 member schools and the parent NIRA. The two reunited in 1961.

Men

Women

Roller Hockey, Inline
National Collegiate Inline Hockey Association (1996–98)

Collegiate Roller Hockey League (1999 through 7/31/2003)

National Collegiate Roller Hockey Association (8/1/2003 - )

Rowing

Varsity Openweight Eights
Men
Rowing Association of American Colleges
The RAAC was the first collegiate athletic organization in the United States.

Intercollegiate Rowing Association

 * Not held in 1933 due to the Depression. However, the first college 2000-meter national championship ever held was conducted by local businessmen on the Olympic course in Long Beach, California, as a substitute. Washington raced both Harvard and Yale for the first time at this event and defeated Yale by eight feet to win the championship. Washington counts this victory among its string of Men’s National Varsity Eight Championships.

† Navy was disqualified from the IRA Regatta for use of an ineligible coxswain. Trophies won by Navy were forfeited and not awarded. Cornell finished second.

Women
(Results for 2V8 and Novice 8 are included for completeness due to the paucity of events conducted.)

Varsity Fours

Varsity Lightweight Eights
Intercollegiate Rowing Association
Men

Women

Lightweight Four/Double
Intercollegiate Rowing Association
Men's Varsity Lightweight Four

Women's VarsityLightweight Four(with coxswain)

Women's VarsityLightweight Double Scull

Overall Points
Intercollegiate Rowing Association

Men
The IRA awards the Jim Ten Eyck Trophy, named in honor of Syracuse's rowing coach (1903–1938), to the team that accumulates the most points during the IRA Championship Regatta in a system based on the finishing places of three eights crews. From 1952 through 1973, the winning team was the one with the most points in the varsity, junior varsity and freshman eights. Starting in 1974, all races counted in the scoring under a system adopted by the coaches of the Eastern Association of Rowing Colleges. More recently, the scoring system was revised to include only three of the four possible eights from each school in the points standings.

† Navy was disqualified from the IRA Regatta for use of an ineligible coxswain. Trophies won by Navy were forfeited and not awarded.

Women and Combined

Smaller Colleges
The Aberdeen Dad Vail Regatta, which is held in Philadelphia and is sponsored by the Dad Vail Rowing Association, is a national championship caliber regatta for lower level college teams. It is the largest collegiate regatta in the nation.

Men's Openweight Team (1982–96)
The now defunct National Collegiate Rowing Championship was a quasi-official national championship (as nothing until that time could be called "official" rather than de facto) for men's collegiate rowing held in Cincinnati, Ohio between 1982 and 1996. During these years Harvard, Yale and Washington, three of the sport's powers, did not participate in the IRAs. In 1982, a Harvard alumnus decided to remedy this perceived problem by establishing a heavyweight varsity National Collegiate Rowing Championship race in Cincinnati, Ohio. It paid for the winners of the Pac-10 Championship, the Eastern Sprints, the IRA and the Harvard-Yale race to attend. It was a finals-only event, and other crews could attend if they paid their own way and there was room in the field. After 1996 the race was discontinued.

Women's Varsity Eights (1971–96)
The National Women's Rowing Association (NWRA) sponsored an annual open eights national championship from 1971 to 1979, among college and non-college teams. (There were no eights prior to 1971.) During this period, only in 1973 and 1975 did a college team win the national eights championship outright. According to US Rowing Association, contemporary news reports in 1976 and 1977 do not mention a national collegiate title. Beginning in 1980, the NWRA sponsored the Women's Collegiate National Championship, including varsity eights. In 1986 the NWRA dissolved after recognizing US Rowing's assuming of responsibility as the national governing body for women's rowing.

NWRA Open National ChampionshipEights top college finishers, 1971–1979 (champion in parentheses) :
1971 Washington (first place - Vesper Boat Club)
1972 Washington (first place - College Boat Club)
1973 Radcliffe College (NWRA open champion)
1974 Radcliffe College (first place - Vesper Boat Club)
1975 Wisconsin (NWRA open champion)
1976 Wisconsin (first place - College Boat Club)
1977 Wisconsin (first place - Vesper Boat Club)
1978 Wisconsin (first place - Burnaby Boat Club)
1979 Yale (first place - Burnaby BC)

NWRA / US Rowing Women's Collegiate National Championship, Varsity eights :

* simultaneous AIAW championship, the only one conducted

The above Women's Varsity 8 results are included for completeness, even though women's rowing is now an NCAA sport and has had annual NCAA women's championships from 1997, in which women currently compete in a Varsity 8, a Second Varsity 8, and a Varsity Four.

Other
USRowing announced that an inaugural USRowing Collegiate National Championship regatta was to be held May 21–23, 2010, at Mercer Lake in West Windsor, N.J. The regatta was to be open to all athletes enrolled in a college or university. Events were to include both small and large boats, from single sculls to eights. The regatta was to be open to all collegiate programs, club or varsity, across all divisions and was to include both lightweight and open weight boat classes. USRowing stated that it hoped to provide a chance for varsity and club programs to compete head-to-head on a 2000-meter course and an opportunity for collegiate athletes to compete in small boats and sculling events.

Rugby

Rugby became an NCAA Emerging Sports for Women in 2003.

Rugby 7s

Collegiate Rugby Championship
Organized by National Collegiate Rugby from 2021 under license for name and logo.

Men

Women

USA Rugby Sevens Collegiate National Championships
In the first three years, strong teams that won bids declined to participate.

Men

Women

National Collegiate Rugby Organization
Men, Division II

2022 – Indiana University of Pennsylvania

Small College 
Men

Small College 
Women

American Collegiate Rugby Association (Women)

National Intercollegiate Rugby Association (Women)

Rugby Union
The governance of collegiate rugby was split and diverged in 2021. The umbrella of the USA Rugby Collegiate Council includes College Rugby Association of America (CRAA), American Collegiate Rugby Association (ACRA), American College Rugby (ACR), and independent conferences. National Collegiate Rugby (NCR), formerly NSCRO, expanded beyond small colleges to include the higher divisions. Men's and women's conferences each chose as individual conferences (in some cases, schools within conferences also chose) to align with USA Rugby or NCR.

Women
Twelve women's conferences that played historically in DII left the oversight of USA Rugby to join NCR.  Beginning in 2021, women's college rugby within NCR is split between Small College and an Open Division. The Open Division, which NCR now refers to as its DI, is made up of teams from these 12 conferences.

According to Goff Rugby Report, the DI Elite women's teams are part of College Rugby Association of America, and so are the vast majority of women's DI conferences (eight conferences) and the independents. There are also a couple of DII or hybrid conferences within CRAA.

The American Collegiate Rugby Association is a group of four DII-level women's conferences remaining under the aegis of USA Rugby, which included 62 teams as of June, 2020.

The NCAA women's varsity programs in the National Intercollegiate Rugby Association run their own competition and have a sanctioning agreement with USA Rugby.

Men
In 2021, most DII men's rugby conferences aligned with NCR.

Two men's conferences that played DIA in 2019 joined NCR in 2021, as have three DIAA conferences. Under NCR, they competed in fall 2021 as DI and DIAA, with separate postseasons.

Men's DIAA was dramatically split in 2021, with both NCR and CRAA-run postseasons in the fall. There will likely be a CRAA-run postseason in spring 2022. According to Goff Rugby Report, there is no way to have a men's DIAA national champion in 2021–2022.

In 2021, there are five men's DIA conferences plus independents under USA Rugby/CRAA.

Men, Division I
National Invitational Championship
1972 Palmer College of Chiropractic 28–17 Navy
1973 Palmer College of Chiropractic 13–4 Illinois
1974 Texas A&M def. LSU
1975 
1976 (moved from spring to fall) LSU 21–3 Palmer College of Chiropractic
1977 (moved from fall to following spring)
1978 Palmer College of Chiropractic 19–4 LSU
1979 Palmer College of Chiropractic
 

National Collegiate Rugby

Men, Division I

2021 (fall) – St. Bonaventure 19, Penn State 18

Men, Division I-AA

2021 (fall) – Virginia Tech 34, West Chester 22

Women, Division I
USA Rugby

As of fall 2021, according to Goff Rugby Report, "The vast majority of women's DI conferences are playing as part of College Rugby Association of America" (USA Rugby).

National Collegiate Rugby

Women, Division I
According to Goff Rugby Report, the vast majority of women's teams and conferences that switched to working with NCR for fall 2021 previously competed in USA Rugby's DII women's competition. NCR refers to this division as its DI. In 2021, Life University fielded a largely freshman and sophomore team.

2021 (fall) – Life University 87, Northern Iowa 3

Division II
USA Rugby

National Collegiate Rugby

Men, Division II

2021 (fall) – Thomas More

Other D1/D2
American Collegiate Rugby Association (Women)
ACRA formed in 2013 as a group committed to fall 15s and spring 7s. As of 2021, the American Collegiate Rugby Association is a group of DII-level women's conferences — Tri-State, MARC, Rugby Northeast, NEWCRC. In 2021, they invited the Rocky Mountain Conference to send teams to the ACRA playoffs, which are held in the fall; five conferences sent eight teams. According to Goff Rugby Report, "ACRA's championship isn't technically a [national] women's DII championship, but it's pretty close, [as] there are teams that play DII-level rugby and will play in the spring [2022]. They won't be ACRA."

National Intercollegiate Rugby Association (Women)
The NCAA women's varsity programs in the National Intercollegiate Rugby Association run their own competition and have a sanctioning agreement with USA Rugby. It began play in 2015.

Small College Championship
National Collegiate Rugby Organization

From 2002 to 2006 for Men's Division III and from 2003 to 2006 for Women's Division III, event name was "East Coast Division III Collegiate Championship." In 2007, events were renamed to "National Men's Collegiate Division III Championship", "National Women's Collegiate Division III Championship" and "National Women's Collegiate Division IV Championship". Effective August 2012, Small College Championship nomenclature replaced Division III.

Sailing

Inter-Collegiate Sailing Association Championship

The Inter-Collegiate Sailing Association (ICSA; Inter-Collegiate Yacht Racing Association prior to 2001) holds National Championships in six different events. Since intercollegiate sailing is a fall and spring sport, three of these championships are held in the fall and three are held in the spring.

The Fall Championships are for single-handed men and women and sloops. The Sloop Championships take place in mid-November using small keelboats supplied by the venue. Each sloop team sails with a crew of three. In the fall of 2010, the sloop championship was converted to a match racing format.

The ICSA National Championship Regatta is held once each year in May and is actually composed of three different regattas: a Team Racing Championship, a Women's Championship and a Coed Dinghy Championship. The most prestigious of these events is the Coed Dinghy Championship.

The title for best overall performance (Leonard M. Fowle Trophy winner) includes the six National Championships: Men's Singlehanded, Women's Singlehanded, Match Racing Championship (previously Sloop), Women's Dinghy, Team Race, and Coed Dinghy.

Collegiate Offshore Large Boats Championship
Kennedy Cup, boat class: Navy 44

Collegiate Match Racing Championship
Douglas Cup

Snowboard and Ski

United States Collegiate Ski and Snowboard Association

In 2009, events included Giant Slalom, Slalom, Cross-Country Sprints, Cross-Country Relays, Cross-Country Distance, Halfpipe, Slopestyle, SkierCross, and Snowboard Cross. NCAA championship alpine events likewise include slalom and GS. However, the NCAA Nordic program is limited to 2 events. Because the USCSA Nordic competition occurs in 4 or more events each for men and women, the Nordic winners are included here.

Softball (Slow-pitch), Women

After the last AIAW competition in 1982, college championships were conducted by the Amateur Softball Association in 1983 and 1984. It appears that most of the college women's slow-pitch teams at that time were from Florida and North Carolina. After 1984, the highest level of collegiate national championship was conducted by the National Junior College Athletic Association, whose slow-pitch tournament was held from 1983 through 2000.

Squash
College Squash Association

National nine-player team champions: From 1942 to 1988, the title was based on dual-match records, with the team with the best record becoming the national champion. Since 1989, the title has been based on performance in the National Team Championships, with the team winning the “A” division becoming the national champion. 

Between 1956 and 1988, the National Intercollegiate Squash Racquets Association awarded an additional team trophy based on players’ performances in the national individual tournament. From 1956 to 1968, teams competed with four players, and from 1969 to 1988, they competed with six players.

Surfing
 National Scholastic Surfing Association (1978 - )

Synchronized Skating

US Figure Skating

Synchronized Swimming

United States Synchronized Swimming

Preceded by AIAW tournament 1977-82

Table Tennis

National Collegiate Table Tennis Association

Taekwondo
National Collegiate Taekwondo Association

† 1984 was the final year of separate men's and women's team competitions.

‡ Beginning in 1997, the black belt competition has been conducted in a "championship division." Separate team awards were added for other belt colors and novices.

Team Handball

USA Team Handball

The following clubs won a national title in an open category (in these tournaments not all players were current students of the university teams):
Men's Open Division (until 1999 the highest tier in the USA):
Adelphi University: 1971, 1972, 1973, 1974
Air Force: 1978, 2004
UCLA: 1979
University of Utah: 2005
West Point: 2006
Men's Elite Division (highest tier since 2000):
No team has won the title. West Point has one silver and two bronze medals.
Women's Open Division (highest tier in the USA):
Kansas State University: 1975
Ohio State: 1978
University of Minnesota: 1990

Team Tennis, Co-ed (WTT format)
USTA Tennis on Campus, club-level only

Tennis, Indoor

Intercollegiate Tennis Association (1973–present)

 Division I 

 Division III (2001 - present)

 Division II (2020 - present)

Trap & skeet shooting

Association of College Unions International annually sponsors the National Intercollegiate Trap and Skeet Championships. The championships are the only national tournament in which shooters may compete in five different clay target games in the same program: American Trap, International Trap, American Skeet, International Skeet and Sporting Clays. The 2011 championship event is "the 43rd of the championship's history."

1983–1995: ?

Division II
2015: Texas A&M

Triathlon

Triathlon became an NCAA Emerging Sports for Women in 2014.

Sources:

USA Triathlon

* 2006 event was a duathlon (water temperature too cold for swim), with 5K run, 40K bike and 10K run segments.

Tug-of-War
Intercollegiate Association of Amateur Athletes of America

Conducted at the annual track and field championship meet.

Ultimate
Ultimate Players Association (1979-2010), USA Ultimate (2010–present)

Division I

Division III

Wakeboarding
American Wakeboard Association (2001-2004), USA Wakeboard (2005–present), College Wake (2010–present)

Cable Wakeboarding

Water skiing

National Collegiate Water Ski Association

Barefoot Waterskiing

Weightlifting

USA Weightlifting

Wrestling, Women

Women's Collegiate Wrestling Association
Olympic-style (freestyle)

National Collegiate Wrestling Association
Collegiate-style (folkstyle)

National Association of Intercollegiate Athletics
Olympic-style (freestyle)

#invitational tournament

Women's Collegiate Wrestling Coalition
Collegiate-style (folkstyle)
National Collegiate Women's Wrestling Championship for NCAA schools

Intercollegiate team champions of NCAA and AIAW sports
Many team sports that are played at the collegiate level are currently, or at one time were, governed by multi-sport intercollegiate athletic associations that were organized to meet the needs of their member colleges and universities. The oldest of these is the National Collegiate Athletic Association (NCAA), founded in 1906 to address the rash of serious injuries and deaths arising in the collegiate sport of American football. It conducted its first team national championship events in the sport of track and field in 1921. Over the years, the NCAA has added championship events for a variety of sports, with divisions of competition based upon school size and enrollment, and now conducts over 90 championships. Before NCAA events were initiated in particular sports, national governing bodies for many of those sports typically conducted annual collegiate championship events.

The organization that is now the National Association of Intercollegiate Athletics (NAIA) began in 1937 with the first collegiate men's basketball tournament, which led to the formation of the National Association of intercollegiate Basketball in 1940. It serves primarily small colleges. With the growth of organized women's intercollegiate sports, the Division for Girls' and Women's Sports first conducted women's championship events and later created the Association for Intercollegiate Athletics for Women (AIAW) in 1972 to govern women's sports at the collegiate level, coinciding with the advent of Title IX federal legislation. The NCAA later usurped the mission of the AIAW by conducting its first women's championships in twelve sports directly head-to-head with the AIAW in a year of dual team championships in 1981–82. The AIAW was legally dissolved in 1983.

NCAA Team Champions: see NCAA Championships

Pre-NCAA Team Champions: see Pre-NCAA intercollegiate championships

AIAW Team Champions: see AIAW and DGWS Championships

NAIA Team Champions: see NAIA Championships

See also
 List of NCAA schools with the most NCAA Division I championships
 List of NCAA schools with the most Division I national championships
 List of NCAA schools with the most AIAW Division I national championships

References

College sports championships in the United States
Lists of sports championships